The Kirdzhalis have been a social phenomenon in the European possessions of the Ottoman Empire since the late 18th and early 19th centuries.

Although they are often artistically depicted as brigands or bandits in the field, from the literal meaning in Ottoman Turkish, they are well-armed and organized gangs at the disposal and submission of the local Ottoman Ayans.

History 
The beginning of the phenomenon was in Ottoman Albania on the eve of the Russo-Turkish War (1768–1774) and during the Orlov revolt. Because robbers operated in the mountains of the Armatolis, i.e. daalii in Ottoman Turkish, they are not referred to as kirdzhalis. Moscopole was ruined at that time.

In the 1780s, the phenomenon gained momentum and was in full swing under Sultan Selim III. It was a response to the attempts to reform the empire under this sultan and at the same time a response to Nizam-I Cedid.

Kirdzhalis are a phenomenon in Rumelia and to some extent in Bosnia, peripherally affecting Wallachia and Morea on the eve of the Greek War of Independence. The social phenomenon subsided with the Ottoman coups of 1807–1808 and gradually disappeared with the attenuation of the Napoleonic Wars.

The most prominent leader of the Kirdzhalis was Osman Pazvantoglu. With the assassination of Ali Pasha of Ioannina, the phenomenon ended. In world literature this phenomenon appeared in Pushkin's novel of the same name — Kirdzhali.

The name of the Bulgarian town Kardzhali has the same meaning.

See also

 Ottoman army in the 15th–19th centuries
 Deli (Ottoman troops)
 Seimeni
 Sipahi
 Auspicious Incident

References

History of the Ottoman Empire
Kirdzhalis
18th century in Bulgaria
19th century in Bulgaria